The Tecumseh Building, also known as the Francis J. Drolla Building, is a historic building in downtown Springfield, Ohio, United States.  Located at 34 West High Street, it was designed by J.A. Poss and W.E. Russ and is described as being an example of "Early Commercial" architecture.  It was added to the National Register of Historic Places in 2000 for its architectural significance.

See also
National Register of Historic Places listings in Clark County, Ohio

References

National Register of Historic Places in Clark County, Ohio
Commercial buildings on the National Register of Historic Places in Ohio
Commercial buildings completed in 1922
Buildings and structures in Springfield, Ohio